The 2013 Sardinia floods took place in and around the Sardinian town of Olbia between 17 and 19 November 2013. They also affected other parts of northeastern Sardinia and killed at least 18 people. Thousands of people were left homeless. The places which suffered the most damage were Olbia, and in general the whole region of Gallura. The flood caused damages of over 1 billion euro.

Impact
The flooding was associated with an extratropical cyclone in the western Mediterranean Basin in November 2013, named Cyclone Cleopatra (also Ruven by the Free University of Berlin) which developed slow-moving embedded thunderstorm complexes, as cold air flowing from the north entered the Mediterranean and interacted with warm moist air to the east.

Continuous rain over two days resulted in the overflowing of the rivers in the northeastern part of Sardinia, flooding villages like Torpè and towns such as Olbia, Nuoro and Oristano.

Further afield, ferry services between Naples and the islands of Capri, Ischia and Procida were affected by gale-force winds and heavy seas, with bad weather spreading to Calabria and Campania on the Southern Italian mainland. As far north as Rome, authorities were monitoring the Tiber river.

Aftermath
At least 18 people died as a result of the flooding in Sardinia. Enrico Letta, the Italian prime minister, declared a state of emergency on the island, describing it as a "national tragedy", promising 20 million euro for the reconstruction. As of 2014, the aforementioned funds have never been assigned.

On November 19 the Parliament of the European Union  observed a minute's silence in memory of the victims, anticipated from condolence by the president of European Commission José Manuel Durão Barroso.

The date for the national day of mourning was established for November 22, with the flag of Italy at half-mast.

References

External links
European Commission Emergency Response Centre ECHO Daily Map of 19 Nov 2013: Italy - Severe Weather
University of Wisconsin-Madison, Space Science and Engineering Center, CIMSS Satellite Blog: Strong Storm in the Mediterranean
EUMETSAT: Severe Thunderstorms over Sardinia 
Dr. Jeff Masters' WunderBlog: Floods From Mediterranean Storm 'Ruven' Kill 18 in Sardinia, Italy

2013 Sardinia
2013 meteorology
2013 in Italy
2013 floods in Europe
2013 natural disasters
Floods in Italy
History of Sardinia